Léo Schwechlen (born 5 June 1989) is a French professional footballer who plays as a defender for Turkish club Denizlispor.

Career
Born in Montbéliard, Schwechlen spent his early career with Promo Besançon, Racing Besançon, Monaco, Tours and Anorthosis Famagusta and Göztepe.

Schwechlen quit Göztepe on 8 June 2018.

Schwechlen joined BB Erzurumspor on 27 June 2018. On 12 August 2018, Schwechlen scored the first ever Süper Lig goal in the club's history, against Konyaspor at Konya Büyükşehir Stadium, in which they lost 2–3. He played every minute of every league match during the 2018–19 season. 

In August 2019 he returned to Göztepe. On 18 June 2020, Göztepe announced that Schwechlen terminated his contract because of unpaid wages.

References

External links

1989 births
Living people
Sportspeople from Montbéliard
Footballers from Bourgogne-Franche-Comté
French footballers
Racing Besançon players
AS Monaco FC players
Tours FC players
Anorthosis Famagusta F.C. players
Göztepe S.K. footballers
Büyükşehir Belediye Erzurumspor footballers
Denizlispor footballers
Ligue 2 players
Cypriot First Division players
TFF First League players
Süper Lig players
Association football defenders
French expatriate footballers
French expatriate sportspeople in Cyprus
Expatriate footballers in Cyprus
French expatriate sportspeople in Turkey
Expatriate footballers in Turkey